Guillermo "Viriguas" León Quirós (died 7 July 2010) was a Costa Rican football player.

Club career
He played with Deportivo Saprissa during the 1940s and 1950s, and was a member of that team when it reached Costa Rica's First Division in 1949. León scored 47 goals in 1947 while playing with Saprissa in the Third Division, and next year scored 33 goals with the team in the Second Division, after which the team rose to the First Division. He also scored once in their first match at the highest level, a 3-1 win over La Libertad on 21 August 1949.

He also played for Universidad Nacional, Nicolás Marín and Unión Deportiva Moravia in a career spanning from 1947 through 1958.

Death
On 8 July 2010, León died at age 82 after suffering from Alzheimer's disease.

References

External links
History of Deportivo Saprissa

Year of birth missing
1920s births
2010 deaths
Association football forwards
Costa Rican footballers
Deportivo Saprissa players
C.F. Universidad de Costa Rica footballers